Oulad Boubker (Tarifit: Taṛwa Bubker or Wlad Bubker, ⵡⵍⴰⴷ ⴱⵓⴱⴽⴻⵔ; Arabic: اولاد بوبكر) is a commune in the Driouch Province of the Oriental administrative region of Morocco. At the time of the 2004 census, the commune had a total population of 5765 people living in 915 households.

References

Populated places in Driouch Province
Rural communes of Oriental (Morocco)